Deanne Salinger, known professionally as Air Force Amy, is an American legal prostitute, glamour model, adult model, and reality TV performer. MSNBC has called her "a living legend in the world of sex."

Early life
Air Force Amy grew up in rural Ohio, leaving home at the age of 13. She later joined the US Air Force and served in the Philippines as an instructor.

Career

Legal prostitution
Three months prior to being discharged from the US Air Force in 1990, she applied to the nearby Chicken Ranch brothel in Nevada, a legal brothel, and worked continuously as a legal and licensed prostitute in legal brothels in Nevada. She has worked at the Chicken Ranch, the Mustang Ranch (from 1994–97), the Sagebrush Ranch, the Cherry Patch Ranch, Sheri's Ranch, the Kit Kat Guest Ranch and the Moonlite Bunny Ranch beginning in 2000. As a legal Nevada prostitute, she works as an independent contractor who turns in half of her money made at the brothel to the house. In 2003, she earned US$10,000–$50,000 a month, according to The New York Times. Amy persuaded her employer Dennis Hof to offer a Military Appreciation Night: a special promotion for free sex to soldiers.

Film and television
Air Force Amy was featured in HBO's documentaries Cathouse (2002), Cathouse 2 (2003) and Cathouse: The Series (2005), about Nevada's Moonlite Bunny Ranch. She was called "the all-time top earner" and "the master of the game". The Season 1, Episode 5, "She's Got Game" episode (2005), included a personal profile of her. She also appeared in the 2004 BBC television program The Brothel, on the same subject, and the 2005 documentary Pornstar Pets.

References

External links

 
 Official website
 

Living people
American female adult models
American pornographic film actresses
American prostitutes
Pornographic film actors from Ohio
Prostitution in Nevada
Female United States Air Force personnel
Participants in American reality television series
Year of birth missing (living people)
21st-century American women